Latrobe Armory was a historic National Guard armory located at Latrobe, Westmoreland County, Pennsylvania.  It was built in 1928, and was a two-story, rectangular brick building, seven bays by three bays, executed in the Art Deco style. The administrative area was located on the first floor, with the drill hall on the second.

It was added to the National Register of Historic Places in 1989. The structure was demolished in 2011.

References

Armories on the National Register of Historic Places in Pennsylvania
Art Deco architecture in Pennsylvania
Infrastructure completed in 1928
Buildings and structures in Westmoreland County, Pennsylvania
National Register of Historic Places in Westmoreland County, Pennsylvania